Photinia anlungensis is a flower species in the family Rosaceae.

References

anlungensis